Walter Henry Halas (January 15, 1892 – December 20, 1959) was an American baseball player and coach of American football, basketball, and baseball.  He played college baseball at the University of Illinois at Urbana–Champaign from 1914 to 1916 as a pitcher for the Fighting Illini.  Halas later pitched in minor league baseball for the Davenport Blue Sox, Moline Plowboys, and Rock Island Islanders of the Illinois–Indiana–Iowa League.  In 1924, he pitched a no-hitter for the Hanover Raiders of the Blue Ridge League.

Halas died in Chicago on December 20, 1959, at the age of 67.  He was the brother of George Halas, longtime coach and owner of the National Football League's Chicago Bears.

References

External links
 
 

1892 births
1959 deaths
Baseball pitchers
Baseball players from Chicago
Basketball coaches from Illinois
Davenport Blue Sox players
Drexel Dragons baseball coaches
Drexel Dragons football coaches
Drexel Dragons men's basketball coaches
Hanover Raiders players
Haverford Fords baseball coaches
Haverford Fords men's basketball coaches
Illinois Fighting Illini baseball players
Maryland Terrapins football coaches
Minor league baseball managers
Moline Plowboys players
Mount St. Mary's Mountaineers baseball coaches
Mount St. Mary's Mountaineers football coaches
Mount St. Mary's Mountaineers men's basketball coaches
Notre Dame Fighting Irish baseball coaches
Notre Dame Fighting Irish men's basketball coaches
Rock Island Islanders players
Sportspeople from Chicago